Korgon-Tash is a mountain village in Batken Region of Kyrgyzstan. It is part of the Batken District. Its population was 95 in 2021. It lies on the upper course of the river Sokh.

References

Populated places in Batken Region